The Directorate-General for Research and Innovation (DG RTD) is a Directorate-General of the European Commission, located in Brussels, and responsible for the European Union's research and innovation policy and coordination of research and innovation activities. It is headed by Commissioner Mariya Gabriel and acting Director-General Signe Ratso.

Mission 

The Directorate-General for Research and Innovation defines and implements European Research and Innovation (R&I) policy with a view to achieving the goals of the Europe 2020 strategy and its key flagship initiative, the Innovation Union.

To do so, DG RTD contributes to the European Semester by analysing national R&I policies, by assessing their strengths and weaknesses, and by formulating country specific recommendations where necessary. It monitors and contributes to the realisation of the Innovation Union flagship initiative and the completion of the European Research Area. It funds  Research and Innovation through Framework Programmes (currently Horizon 2020) taking a strategic programming approach.

Long-term Objective (2020)

To make Europe a better place to live and work, by developing and implementing R&I policy to improve Europe's competitiveness, boost its growth, create jobs, and tackle the main current and future societal challenges.

Management
 Commissioner: Mariya Gabriel
 Director General (acting): Signe Ratso
 Director Bioeconomy and Food System: Peter Wehrheim

Structure

To fulfil its mission, the Directorate General works closely with several other Commission departments (DGs) and executive agencies.

See also
 European Commissioner for Innovation, Research, Culture, Education and Youth
 EURATOM
 EURODOC
 European Charter for Researchers
 European Institute of Technology (EIT)
 European Research Council (ERC)
 Horizon 2020
 Joint Research Centre (a DG of the European Commission)
 Lisbon Strategy
 Science and technology in Europe
 Scientific Advice Mechanism

References

 EURAXESS - researchers in motion

Directorates-General in the European Commission